William Barbour Agnew (30 December 1880 – 19 August 1936) was a Scottish footballer who played for local club Kilmarnock and Falkirk as well as English clubs Newcastle United, Middlesbrough and Sunderland.

Agnew, a defender born in Kilmarnock, was also capped by the Scotland national team, making three appearances between 1907 and 1908. He coached at Third Lanark after his playing career.

References

External links
 
 International stats at londonhearts.com

1880 births
1936 deaths
Scottish footballers
Footballers from Kilmarnock
Scotland international footballers
Kilmarnock F.C. players
Falkirk F.C. players
Newcastle United F.C. players
Middlesbrough F.C. players
Sunderland A.F.C. players
English Football League players
Scottish Football League players
East Stirlingshire F.C. players
Scottish Football League representative players
Association football defenders
Association football coaches
Third Lanark A.C. non-playing staff